Marwitzia costinigralis is a moth in the family Crambidae. It was described by Koen V. N. Maes in 1998. It is found in Uganda.

References

Moths described in 1998
Spilomelinae